Anchor Crag is a rocky crag on the north side of Airy Glacier,  north-northeast of Mount Gilbert, in the central part of the Antarctic Peninsula. It was photographed from the air by the Ronne Antarctic Research Expedition on November 27, 1947, and surveyed by the Falkland Islands Dependencies Survey, November 4, 1958. The United Kingdom Antarctic Place-Names Committee name is descriptive of a snow patch lodged on the face of the rock which, in 1958, closely resembled a ship's anchor.

References 

Cliffs of Palmer Land